Smriti Narayan Chaudhary is a Nepalese politician and a member of the Provincial Assembly of Province No. 2. He was elected to the Pratinidhi Sabha in the 1999 election on behalf of the Nepali Congress under the FPTP voting system. He was elected to the Pratinidhi Sabha from the proportional list of the party. He is a leader close to the NC Vice-president and former Deputy Prime-minister Bimalendra Nidhi. They both come from the same district and municipality.

Electoral history

1999 legislative elections

References

Living people
Nepali Congress politicians from Madhesh Province
Place of birth missing (living people)
Nepal MPs 2017–2022
Nepal MPs 1999–2002
1950 births